Vladimirs Bespalovs (born 22 June 1988 in Ventspils) is a Latvian professional footballer, who last played for FK Ventspils in the Latvian Higher League.

Bespalovs has represented his country at the U-21 level and has played one match in the full international level. He was firstly called up to the national team for a friendly match against China on 17 November 2010.

External links
 
 Vladimirs Bespalovs at imscouting.com

1988 births
Living people
People from Ventspils
Latvian footballers
Latvian people of Russian descent
Latvia international footballers
FK Ventspils players

Association football defenders